Robber (lit. "Con Man") is a 2008 South Korean television series starring Jang Hyuk and Lee Da-hae. It aired on SBS from January 2 to February 28, 2008 on Wednesdays and Thursdays at 21:55 for 16 episodes.

This is the first time that Jang and Lee were paired together onscreen; they would later star in The Slave Hunters (2010) and Iris II (2013).

Plot
After graduating from high school, Jin Dal-rae begins working at a local bank in Pyeongchang County. There, she meets Jang Tae-oh, a mountain climber, and she follows him to Seoul, where they get married. Dal-rae becomes pregnant, but before the baby is born, Tae-oh is killed in a freak accident in the mountains. Dal-rae moves in with her mother-in-law, Lee Soon-seom, and together the two women raise her daughter, Yoo-jin.

Several years pass, and Soon-seom herself encourages Dal-rae to move on, even setting her up on blind dates. During one such date, Dal-rae meets the elderly and wealthy Chairman Kim, who isn't really looking for a young wife, but searching for a prospective spouse for his socially inept son Jin-goo. Chairman Kim is impressed with Dal-rae's kindness and integrity, and is determined that she become his daughter-in-law.

Meanwhile, Dal-rae also encounters Kwon Oh-joon. Oh-joon was once a boxer, but he quit because he didn't want to mess up his "pretty boy" face. Since then, he has been masquerading as a fund manager, but in reality he is a con artist who lives off lonely, gullible women by scamming them. His sister Oh-sook is married to an abusive husband, and Oh-joon has been paying off her debts, but he soon grows desperate with the loan sharks hounding him and threatening to kill him unless he pays up. Learning that Dal-rae has been saving to start her own business, she becomes his next target. But as he gets to know her and her family, Oh-joon finds himself falling in love for real.

Cast
Jang Hyuk as Kwon Oh-joon 
Lee Da-hae as Jin Dal-rae
Kim Jung-tae as Kim Jin-goo
Kim Hae-sook as Lee Soon-seom, Dal-rae's mother-in-law
Hong Kyung-in as Kim Man-doo, Oh-joon's friend
Son Byong-ho as Kim Ho-jin, gangster boss
Yoon Yoo-sun as Kwon Oh-sook, Oh-joon's sister
Kim Hwan-hee as Jang Yoo-jin (nicknamed "Soon-dae"), Dal-rae's daughter
Kang Ki-hwa as Kim Yeon-ah
Choi Eun-sook
Kim In-ae as Chairman Kim, Jin-goo's father
Ma Dong-seok as Jong-goo, debt collector
Im Hyung-joon as Joong-sik, the other debt collector
Seo Yoo-jung as Oh-joon's ex-girlfriend
Jung Gyu-woon as Jang Tae-oh, Dal-rae's husband
Kim Eun-joo as Young-sook (cameo, ep 1)
Shin Seung-hwan

International broadcast

References

External links
Robber official SBS website 

2008 South Korean television series debuts
2008 South Korean television series endings
Seoul Broadcasting System television dramas
South Korean romance television series
Television series by IHQ (company)